Neodohrniphora is a genus of flies in the family Phoridae.

Species
N. acromyrmecis Borgmeier, 1925
N. arcuata Brown, 2001
N. arnaudi Borgmeier, 1966
N. attae Disney, 1996
N. bragancai Brown, 2001
N. calverti Malloch, 1914
N. cognata Prado, 1976
N. curvinervis (Malloch, 1914)
N. declinata Borgmeier, 1925
N. dissita Brown, 2001
N. elongata Brown, 2001
N. erthali Brown, 2001
N. inferna Brown, 2001
N. isomorpha Brown, 2001
N. leei Brown, 2001
N. mexicanae Disney, 1996
N. montana Borgmeier, 1925
N. pala Brown, 2001
N. prolixa Brown, 2001
N. robusta Borgmeier, 1925
N. similis Prado, 1976
N. tonhascai Brown, 2001
N. wasmanni Borgmeier, 1928

References

Phoridae
Platypezoidea genera